Muqaddas is a 2015 Pakistani romantic, thriller television series premiered  on Hum TVon 25 May 2015. The serial is produced by Momina Duraid under MD Productions. It stars Noor Hassan Rizvi, Iqra Aziz,  ZQ, Hina Khawaja Bayat and Farhan Ali Agha. At 15th Lux Style Awards,  it received three nominations that includes Best TV Play for Muqaddas, Best TV Actor for Noor Hassan and Best TV Writer for Adeel Razzaq.

Plot
A married woman named Muqaddas is kidnapped on her wedding night named. A ransom is paid for Muqaddas to be returned home. Aatir tries to find Muqaddas's kidnappers, but to no avail, followed by confusion and blame. It’s a thriller so no spoilers!

Cast
 Noor Hassan Rizvi as Aatir
 Iqra Aziz as Muqaddas
 Zainab Qayyum as Tehreem
 Hina Bayat as Ruhi
 Farhan Ali Agha as Akbar
 Khalid Anam as Jahanzeb
 Fazila Qazi as Mariyum
 Muhammad Asad as Mohib
 Nida Khan as Nida
 Agha Jarar as Zain
 Furqan Qureshi as Kabeer
 Fariya Hassan as Annie

Awards

References

External links
 Official Hum TV website

Hum TV original programming
Urdu-language television shows
Pakistani drama television series
2015 Pakistani television series debuts
2015 Pakistani television series endings